Alison "Wilma" Purnell née Alison Brownless (born 1962) is a retired British rower who competed at international level events. She was a World champion and four-time silver medalist in the women's lightweight pairs and fours. She was the first British woman to win six Championship medals.

References

1962 births
Living people
Sportspeople from Oxford
British female rowers
World Rowing Championships medalists for Great Britain